Albert Holmes may refer to:
 Albert Holmes (footballer, born 1942), English football full back
 Albert Holmes (footballer, born 1885) (1885–?), English football outside left